Wild Rags Records was a record label and store in Montebello, California. It was founded in the 1980s by Ricardo Campos. Though Wild Rags started out as a record store in East LA releasing cassettes from bands such as Cherry Street, the zine later distributed influential releases by the likes of Nuclear Death, Impetigo, Brutality, Blood, Sigh, Blasphemy, Necrophobic, Nuctemeron, Extreme Smoke, Crucifer and Internal Bleeding. Richard C would later concentrate on distributing Brazilian heavy metal and selling catalogues.

See also
 List of record labels

External links
Wild Rags discography @ Discogs.com
https://www.facebook.com/crucifertheband/
https://www.discogs.com/artist/541107-Crucifer
https://music.apple.com/us/artist/crucifer/259949038

References

American record labels
Record labels established in 1986
Noise music record labels
Montebello, California
1986 establishments in California